The 2009 Lunar New Year Cup is a football tournament held in Hong Kong on the first and fourth day of the Chinese New Year of the Earth Ox Year (26 January and 29 January 2009).

Format
The two semi-finals for the four participating teams will be held on the first day of the Chinese New Year of Ox (26 January 2009). The winning teams will enter the final and the losing teams play the third-place playoff (Both matches on the fourth day of the Lunar New Year, i.e. 29 January.) Draw in the semi-finals and third-place playoff would be settled by penalty shootout directly, that means no extra time would be played. For the final, a thirty-minute extra time would be played after a draw. A further draw would lead to the penalty shootout.

Participating teams
 Hong Kong League Selection (host)
 South China Pegasus Team
 Sparta Prague
 Suwon Samsung Bluewings

Squads

Hong Kong League Selection
 Team Managers:  Leung Hung Tak,  Pui Kwan Kay,  Ng Kin
 Coaches:  Julio Moreno (Kitchee),  Chan Ho Yin (NT Realty Wofoo Tai Po)
 Physical coach:  Vianney Selin (Kitchee)
 Physio:  So Chun Lung

South China Pegasus Team
 Team Managers:  Steven Lo,  Wong Wai Shun
 Head coach:  Kim Pan-Gon (South China)
 Coaches:  Liu Chun Fai,  Ricardo
 Assistant coaches:  Ku Kam Fai,  Leung Cheuk Cheung
 Management:  Lam Kai Tai,  Lo Kwun Ming,  Lee Yun Wah

Sparta Prague
 Head of Delegation: Jozef Chovanec
 Technical manager: David Simon
 Coaches: Martin Hašek, Jan Kmoch
 Coach Assistant: Jan Stejskal
 Doctor: Jiří Váchal
 Masseurs: Tomáš Stránský, Vít Zelenka
 Kitman: David Matěka
 Marketing Director: Michal Viktorin

Suwon Samsung Bluewings 
 Head coach: Cha Bum-kun
 Coaches: Lee Lim-saeng, Park Kun-ha
 Goalkeeper coach: Cho Byung-deuk
 Official: Kim Jin-hoon
 Team manager: Yang Dae-hyun
 Therapist: You Hoan-mo
 Video analyst:  Jin Qingyi
 Interpreter: Park Sung-jin
 Kit manager: Kim Si-woong

Fixtures
All times given in Hong Kong Time (UTC+8).

Semi-finals

Third place match

Final

Bracket

Top scorers
1 goal
  Zamudio
  Cacá
  Tales Schütz
  Kim Yeon-gun
  Ondřej Kušnír

References

External links
 2009 Lunar New Year Cup Match Information, HKFA Website

Lunar
Lunar New Year Cup